Cefazaflur (INN) is a first-generation cephalosporin antibiotic.

Synthesis 
Cefazaflur stands out among this group of analogues because it lacks an arylamide C-7 side chain (see cephacetrile for another example).

Cefazaflur is synthesized by reaction of 3-(1-methyl-1H-tetrazol-5-ylthiomethylene)-7-amino-cephem-4-carboxylic acid (1) with trifluoromethylthioacetyl chloride (2).

References 

Cephalosporin antibiotics
Enantiopure drugs
Tetrazoles
Organofluorides